Eugen V. Witkowsky (Евге́ний Влади́мирович Витко́вский; June 18, 1950 – February 3, 2020) was a Russian fiction and fantasy writer, literary scholar, poet, and translator.

Biography 
Witkowsky came from a family of Russified Germans who owned a small cardboard factory in Moscow. He spent his childhood in Siberia, Central Asia, and Western Ukraine. From 1967–1971, he was a student of literary studies at Moscow State University, then took a leave of absence and never returned, becoming engaged in literature and dissident activities. Until censorship was lifted in USSR, Witkowsky could only publish poetic translations; he translated and published numerous poems by John Milton, Christopher Smart, Robert Southey, John Keats, Oscar Wilde, Rudyard Kipling; by Scottish gaelic poets John Roy Stewart, Duncan Ban MacIntyre, Rob Donn, John MacLean (Bard MacLean), and by Luís Vaz de Camões, Fernando Pessoa, Rainer Maria Rilke, Joost van den Vondel, Arthur Rimbaud, Paul Valéry and others.

In the 1990s, he was mostly engaged in literary studies, compiling and editing a four-volume anthology of Russian poetry abroad "We lived on a different planet those days", a three-volume collected works of Georgy Ivanov, works of Ivan Yelagin, Arseny Nesmelov and others. His three-volume historical fantasy "Paul II" was published in 2000, its two sequels, "Saint Vitus Land" and "Chertovar" in 2001 and 2007 respectively. The latter two novels were selected for the short list of the most prestigious Russian F&SF prize, "The ABS Prize" ("Arkady and Boris Strugatsky Prize").

In 2003, Witkowsky founded website "Vek Perevoda" ("The Age of Translation", www.vekperevoda.com) with a web forum functioning as a school of poetic translation. In 2005 and 2006, Vodolei Publishers issued two anthologies of Russian poetic translation, based on the site's collections and edited by Witkowsky; this edition will be continued.

In 2007, the same publisher printed an anthology "Seven Centuries of English Poetry" in three volumes (about 3000 pages), compiled by Witkowsky and presenting for the first time in a single edition works by almost 500 English-language poets from 1300 to 2000 recreated by 134 translators since the 1800s. This anthology exceeds twentyfold any other previous Russian edition devoted to the poets of England, Scotland and Ireland.

Witkowsky was a laureate of several international awards, an Expert of the Translators' Union of Russia, member of the Writers' Union of USSR and Russia since 1983. His mentors in poetry were Arcadiy Shteinberg and Sergei Petrov.

Works

Prose (novels) 
 "Paul II". Vol. I: "God Forbid!". Vol. 2: "The Day of Piranha". Vol. 3: "A Handful of Power". М., AST; Kharkov, Folio. 2000.
 "Saint Vitus Land". М., AST; Kharkov, Folio. 2001. Second edition: М. Vodolei Publishers, 2007
 «Chertovar» . М. Vodolei Publishers, 2007

Literary studies 
 From the Contemporary Poetry of Netherlands. E. Witkowsky, Ed. М., 1977
 From the 17th Century Poetry of Netherlands. E. Witkowsky, Ed. Leningrad, 1983.
 Georgy Ivanov. Collected works (three volumes). E. Witkowsky, V. Kreid, Eds. М., 1994
 Ivan Yelagin. Colelcted works (two volumes). E. Witkowsky, Ed. М., 1998.
 Stanzas of the Century – 2. An anthology of the 20th century Russian poetic translation. E. Witkowsky, Ed. М., 1998.
 Seven Centuries of French Poetry. 1300—1999. E. Witkowsky, Ed. SPb, 1999.
 Phonetic Noise (together with L. Latynin ). М., 2002.
 Robert Southey. Ballads. E. Witkowsky, Ed. М., 2006 (bilingual edition)
 Charles Baudelaire. Le Fleurs du Mal. E. Witkowsky and V. Rezvy, Eds.. М., 2006.(bilingual edition).
 Arseny Nesmelov. Collected works (two volumes). E. Witkowsky, A. Kolesov, Li Men, V. Rezvy, Eds. Vladivostok, 2006
 Alexander Montgomerie. The Cherrie and the Slae. Sonnets. E. Witkowsky, Ed. and annotations. М., 2007
 Paul Valéry. Complete works. E. Witkowsky, Ed. and introduction. М., 2007
 Seven Centuries of English Poetry. In three volumes  / E. Witkowsky, compilation. V. Rezvy, Ed.. Introduction by E. Witkowsky. Reference notes by E. Witkowsky, V. Votrin, A. Prokopiev, V. Rezvy, A. Serebrennikov. Design and typesetting by Marina and Leonid Orlushin. – М.: Vodolei Publishers, 2007. Bk.1: 1032 pp. Bk. 2: 992 pp. Bk. 3.: 1008 pp.

Poetic translations 
 Uys Krige. A Ballad of a Great Courage. Transl. from Afrikaans by E. Witkowsky. М., 1977.
 Stanzas on Immortality. From Western German poetry. Transl. from German. М., 1987
 Joost van den Vondel. Tragedies. Transl. from Dutch. М., LP., 1988.
 Constantijn Huygens. Didactic Pictures. Transl. from Dutch. М, 2002.

External links 

 Eugen Witkowsky: «The Perpetual Listener» in «Moshkov's Library»
 Works on Lib.ru
 Witkowsky's blog on LiveJournal
 Anthology «The Age of Translation»
 Eugen Witkowsky «The Perpetual Listener»

1950 births
2020 deaths
Writers from Moscow
Russian male poets
Russian editors
Russian and Soviet-German people
20th-century Russian translators
Soviet literary historians
Soviet male writers
20th-century Russian male writers